The men's discus F53/54 event at the 2008 Summer Paralympics took place at the Beijing National Stadium on 14 September. There was a single round of competition; after the first three throws, only the top eight had 3 further throws.
The competition was won by Fan Liang, representing .

 
WR = World Record. PR = Paralympic Record. SB = Seasonal Best.

References

Athletics at the 2008 Summer Paralympics